The 2008 Pitch and putt World Cup was held on the Papendal course, close to Arnhem (Netherlands) and was the third edition for this championship promoted by the Federation of International Pitch and Putt Associations (FIPPA), with 14 national teams. Ireland won the World Cup after defeating The Netherlands in the final.

Teams

Qualifying round

Second round 

Places 9-14

Final rounds 

Quarter finals

Places 5-8

Semifinals

Places 13-14

Places 11-12

Places 9-10

Places 7-8

Places 5-6

Places 3-4

FINAL

Final standings

See also 
 Pitch and Putt World Cup

References 
 Qualifying round
 Groups for 9 to 14 places
 Quarter finals
 Semifinals and places 5-8
 Finals

External links 
 World Cup 2008
 Federation of International Pitch and Putt Associations

Pitch and putt competitions